Dicerorhinus (Greek: "two" (dio), "horn" (keratos), "nose" (rhinos)) is a genus of the family Rhinocerotidae, consisting of a single extant species, the two-horned Sumatran rhinoceros (D. sumatrensis), and several extinct species. The genus likely originated in the Mid to Late Pliocene of Northern Indochina and South China. Many species previously placed in this genus probably belong elsewhere.

Taxonomy
Historically, Dicerorhinus was a wastebasket taxon. Revisions by several authors over the years have removed many species:

Transferred to Stephanorhinus
Dicerorhinus merckii
Dicerorhinus hemitoechus
Dicerorhinus etruscus
Dicerorhinus yunchuchenensis
Dicerorhinus jeanvireti
Dicerorhinus choukoutienensis (synonym of Merck's rhinoceros)
Dicerorhinus orientalis (synonym of Merck's rhinoceros)
Dicerorhinus nipponicus

Transferred to Dihoplus
Dicerorhinus megarhinus
Dicerorhinus schleiermacheri
Dicerorhinus ringstroemi

Transferred to Caementodon
Dicerorhinus caucasicus

Transferred to Lartetotherium
Dicerorhinus sansaniensis

Transferred to Rusingaceros
Dicerorhinus leakeyi
Species provisionally considered valid include:

 †Dicerorhinus fusuiensis originally described as Rhinoceros fusuiensis Early Pleistocene, South China.
 †Dicerorhinus cixianensis Chen and Wu, 1976 Middle Miocene, known from one locality in Cixian County, Hebei Province, China, consisting of a single partial skull and juvenile mandible, notably small in size.
 †Dicerorhinus gwebinensis Zin-Maung-Maung-Thein et al., 2008 Known from a skull of Pliocene-Early Pleistocene age found in Myanmar. Some authors have considered the skull not distinguishable from that of D. sumatrensis.

References 

 Groves, Colin P., and Fred Kurt (1972). "Dicerorhinus sumatrensis". Mammalian Species (21): 1–6.
 "A new species of  Dicerorhinus (Rhinocerotidae) from the Plio-Pleistocene of Myanmar"
 

Rhinoceroses
Mammal genera
Mammal genera with one living species